In an Outrage is the eight studio album by the American heavy metal band Chastain, released in 2004 through Leviathan Records. The album was re-issuued in Europe by Massacre Records in 2006.

Track listing
All songs by David T. Chastain and Kate French

"In an Outrage" – 5:13
"Malicious Pigs" - 4:59
"Lucky to Be Alive" - 4:56
"Souls the Sun" - 6:02
"Bullet from a Gun" - 4:06
"Women Are Wicked" - 5:15
"Tortured Love" - 4:29
"New Beginnings" - 5:07
"Rule the World" - 5:49
"Hamunaptra" - 6:08

Japanese edition bonus tracks
"Human Sacrifice" - 6:10
"Seven" - 6:30
"Long and Tortured Love" - 6:26

Korean edition bonus tracks
"In an Outrage" (alternative version) - 5:02
"Bleeding Heart" - 2:29

Personnel

Band members
Kate French - lead and backing vocals
David T. Chastain - guitars, backing vocals, engineer, producer
Dave Starr - bass
Larry Howe - drums, backing vocals

Production
Juan Ortega, London Wilde - engineers
Christian Schmid - mixing, mastering

References

2004 albums
Chastain (band) albums
Massacre Records albums
Albums with cover art by Travis Smith (artist)